Amirabad (also Romanized as Amīrābād) is a village in Raheb Rural District, in the Central District of Kabudarahang County, Hamadan Province, Iran. At the 2006 census, its population was 2,333, in 558 families.

References 

Populated places in Kabudarahang County